The River Soar is a major tributary of the River Trent in the English East Midlands and is the principal river of Leicestershire. The source of the river is midway between Hinckley and Lutterworth. The river then flows north through Leicester, where it is joined by the Grand Union Canal. Continuing on through the Leicestershire Soar Valley, it passes Loughborough and Kegworth until it reaches the Trent at the county boundary. In the 18th century, the Soar was made navigable, initially between Loughborough and the Trent, and then through to Leicester. It was not until the early 19th century that it was linked by the Grand Union Canal to the wider network to the south and to London.

Name
The name of the Soar is included in a family of old river-names derived from a root *ser- "to flow", alongside (among others)
Saravus (Soar, a tributary of the Moselle in Belgium),  Sera (la Serre, la Cère and le Séran, three rivers in France), Serantia (Sierentz, Alsace), Serma (Schremm, Brandenburg), Sora (Cwm Sorgwm, Wales), Sorna (die Zorn, Alsace), Sara (Saire), Saar(e) (Brandenburg), Saros (Sar, Spain), Sarius (Serio, Lombardy), Sarià (Lithuania), Saravus (Saar, Germany), Sarnivos (Sernf, Glarus), etc.

According to a suggestion due to William Somner (1701) the Soar river may formerly have been called the Leir,  from Brittonic *Ligera or *Ligora, cognate with the French Loire. This theory is based on the name of Leicester (as well as Loughborough and the village of Leire) being derived from the name of the river.

Course

The Soar rises near Wibtoft in Warwickshire, and flows north to join the Soar Brook near Sharnford, it then continues in a north-easterly direction, passing through Croft and between Narborough and Littlethorpe, until on the outskirts of Leicester it is joined by the Sence near Enderby. Before flowing through the centre of the city it meets the Grand Union Canal at Aylestone, where it is also joined by the River Biam.  After passing over Freemens Weir, the river splits and recombines with the canal, creating an area of Leicester called Bede Island. The navigable arm that runs to the east has been canalised with parallel banks and is known as ‘The Mile Straight’.  Beyond Blackfriars, the river splits again to form Frog Island and Abbey Park; it recombines at Belgrave where it passes beside the National Space Centre.

Once out of the city the Soar passes Birstall and threads its way through the lakes of Watermead Country Park, until it reaches Wanlip. The river then meets the once navigable River Wreake, near Cossington Mill, with another tributary the Rothley Brook, joining the river just downstream. The Soar continues north-east to reach Mountsorrel then passes between Quorn and Barrow-on-Soar, at which point an arm of the canal extends into Loughborough, although the river passes to the East of the town at Cotes. Downstream of Stanford on Soar the river forms the county boundary between Nottinghamshire and Leicestershire. Between Stanford and Normanton on Soar, the canal rejoins the river, which then continues to Zouch, passing the ‘Devils Elbow’ to reach Kegworth. Downstream of Kegworth, it meets the Kingston Brook, near the village of the same name, passing Ratcliffe-on-Soar and its power station, before flowing into the Trent at Trent Lock.

Pollution

The River Soar is rich in wildlife with thriving bird, fish and plant populations being popular with wildlife enthusiasts.  The river was once notorious for its unusual pink colour - a result of discharges from Leicester's prosperous textile industries. However the end to textile industries near the river in Leicester and clean-up work by the Environment Agency has now restored it to its natural state.

Industry now wanting to attempt to discharge any sewage waste into the river must now obtain an agreement from the Environment Agency. Several consents have been granted to companies to use the River Soar, however the quantity and quality of the sewage is strictly controlled to a preset amount that is agreed on with the Environment Agency.

The quality of any water is determined by what is able to contaminate the river upstream, the River Soar is constantly monitored by the Environment Agency which keeps check on the level of pollution. The pollution in the water running through the Soar in the city of Leicester is low and the water is generally of good quality; however there is a significant decrease in the quality just downstream of the city, where the Wanlip sewage treatment works enters the river.

Unfortunately though new tourism industry has caused environmental problems; Barge hulls and propellers may cause “physical damage and uprooting” of plants and turbulence may increase water turbidity to the extent that light may not reach underwater plants, reducing photosynthesis. Sewage works have an adverse effect on water life.

History

 1634 Thomas Skipwith of Cotes obtained a grant from Charles I to make the river Soar "portable for barges and boats", though the scheme was never completed.
 1794 The Leicester Canal was opened, making the Soar navigable for almost . The western line was also opened- this was known as the Charnwood Forest Branch. However, most of the branch was made up of rail tracks rather than a waterway. This included a  uphill climb from Loughborough Basin. At the western end of the branch, rail lines travelled towards Coleorton and Swannington. A track to Cloudhill, which would have connected to similar lines on the Ashby Canal, was proposed but never built.
 1795 Another branch line (operated by a separate company) opened from the main line of the Leicester Canal (between Cossington and Syston) to Melton Mowbray. The line was sometimes known as the Wreake Navigation, though it is better known as the Melton Mowbray Navigation. This new line was so successful that within a year William Jessop was appointed to survey another new line which would extend the Melton Mowbray Navigation to Oakham in Rutland, a further . The extension would be called the Oakham Canal. An Act of Parliament was passed and work began.
 1796 While the lines to Leicester and Melton Mowbray were doing very well, trade on the Charnwood Forest Branch was very slow to pick up. The company even put on demonstrations in an attempt to encourage its use. With no real success being gained from this the company went into the coal carrying and selling business itself.
 1797 A proposal to extend the main line of the Leicester Canal much further south was announced. A new canal, the Leicestershire & Northamptonshire Union Canal, would link the river Soar with the River Nene. However, like many great ideas, the money ran out before the imagination did and the line reached just 17 of the proposed , coming to a stop at Debdale Wharf near Kibworth Beauchamp. Thus the Leicestershire & Northamptonshire Canal never even got close to Northamptonshire. In fact, the whole project had proved to be something of a failure, the company having spent thousands of pounds building a waterway which passed nowhere in particular and ended in the middle of the countryside miles from any major town. Meanwhile, the Charnwood Forest Branch was still struggling to attract any trade. Water supply was one reason for lack of use, so the company built Blackbrook Reservoir. Following this, trade picked up but only very slightly.
 1802 The Oakham Canal opened after costing almost £70,000 to build. Boats could now travel onto the River Soar from Rutland.
 1809 The main line of the Leicestershire & Northamptonshire Canal was extended from its resting place near Kibworth Beauchamp to Market Harborough where once again the work came to a stop. All the same, it was now a considerable navigation, linking the south of Leicestershire to the river Trent. However, there was still no link to the Grand Junction Canal.
 1810 By now ideas of connecting Leicester to Northampton seemed pointless. The Grand Junction Canal was running a tramway into Northampton and would surely soon convert this to a full navigation. The obvious thing to do now was to connect the Leicester navigations to the Grand Junction Canal.
 1814 The new link between the Leicester navigations and the Grand Junction Canal opened and was named the Grand Union Canal (not to be confused with the later canal route of the same name).
 1832 The Leicester and Swannington Railway opened from the Leicestershire coalfield to a wharf alongside the canal at West Bridge, Leicester. This allowed Leicestershire coal to be cheaply carried on southwards for sale in London.
 1848 The owners of the River Soar Navigation were finally able to officially abandon the Charnwood Forest Branch which had stood idle since 1801.
 1877 After 80 years, the Melton Mowbray (or Wreake) Navigation also closed, leaving Melton Mowbray with no waterway outlet to the main canal system.
 1886 Mr. Fellows of Fellows Morton & Clayton (who were the main carriers on the Grand Union link) pushed the company to convert the canal to wide beam. When this was not done he tried to encourage the Grand Junction Company to buy the link.
 1894 – The Grand Union and the Leicestershire & Northamptonshire Union canals were purchased by the Grand Junction Canal Company. By now, though, even the Grand Junction Company wasn't whole-heartedly in favour of widening the link. Instead they looked into methods of making the lock flights more efficient. The simple answer was to make a duplicate flight alongside the existing locks to make two-way traffic but this would cause other problems, especially water supply, which was already a major headache.
 1931 – The whole stretch of waterway from Norton Junction through to Leicester and on to Long Eaton was merged with the Grand Junction Canal to form the Grand Union Canal.

Industry

The expansion of the canal meant that industry could start to develop along the canal side, with the transport provided by the canal being “vital to the industry.” This included buildings and industries like “wind and watermills; brewing and malting; bridges; canal and railway structures; public utilities.”

“By 1895, there were 231 listed hosiery manufacturers in the county. In
Leicester, the industry employed 10% of the population in 1851, and around 7% in 1881 and 1911.” This shows the importance of hosiery to Leicester’s economy. This industry needed a consistent supply of water and needed transport links, so was located alongside the canal. Due to the excellent transport links provided by the Grand Union Canal, the Hosiery industry was able to expand rapidly.

Many of these factories however soon outgrew themselves, moving to new larger sites, which vacated space for other trades such as boot and shoe manufacture, printing or box making.

Railway competition in the nineteenth century reduced canal profits. This was the beginning of the end for many of the companies who owned the canals; several of these companies converted their canals to railways while many of the others were bought out by railway companies looking to expand their businesses.

With the decline of industry in the 1960s, the warehouses and factories which were once the core of Leicester’s economy had fallen into dereliction.  Leicester City Council has made a move towards re-developing the waterfront "offering one of the most exciting waterside regeneration opportunities in the country." The company is currently building luxury waterside apartments. This will enhance the areas aesthetic values. Research conducted by Newcastle University suggests that people’s desire to reside on the waterfront and enjoy recreation offered by the canal is upset by "visually unattractive features, such as run-down derelict areas and poor design".

The re-development plan has included the building of the Walkers stadium, home to Leicester City F.C., along the canal in 2002, "from a barren, desolate piece of waste-ground has risen a stunning futuristic collaboration of steel and glass that dominates the skyline of Leicester." Old warehouses have also been converted into student accommodation for De Montfort University increasing the value of the area.

On the eastern bank of the Soar in central Leicester are the premises of Donisthorpe and Company, a producer of textiles. The Donisthorpe Mill, also known as Friars' Mill, is one of the oldest mills in the East Midlands, and manufacturing activity has occurred on its site since the 1730s. The Mill was awarded listed status in 1975. A number of surrounding buildings, including a Victorian pump house, were also listed at this time. The Donisthorpe Company left the factory in 1983, which led to immediate concerns about the mill's conservation. The building stood empty for a number of years, and fell into a state of disrepair. In July 2012, a fire destroyed its roof, clocktower and most of the interior. In November 2012, Leicester City Council announced its decision to purchase and restore the Donisthorpe Mill building.

Legend
Geoffrey of Monmouth, who claimed Leicester was named for an eponymous King Leir, claimed that the king was buried in an underground chamber beneath the river near Leicester. This was supposedly devoted to the god Janus.

Leir, Lerion, and Ligora(ceastre) all derive from the old Brittonic name of the River Soar, *Ligera or *Ligora.

The body of King Richard III was sometimes said to have been thrown into the river during the Dissolution of the Monasteries under Henry VIII. From this legend, the bridge carrying the A47 across the Soar at Leicester is known as "King Richard's Bridge". However, in 2013, it was confirmed that the skeleton discovered beneath a car park in 2012 was, in fact, that of Richard III and, in March 2015, the skeleton was re-interred in Leicester Cathedral.

Tourism

The Soar is now a hive of tourism rather than of industry. Holiday narrowboat cruises are extremely popular as it is a relaxing way to visit the country and get ‘in-touch’ with nature. The tow-paths next to the canal are used for “cycling, rambling, horse-riding and picnicking” (Leicester City Council, 2005).

The waterway is a popular location for match and occasional fishing. There are large carp, chub, bream, roach, and perch in the canal, plus dace and barbel on some stretches (www.waterscape.com/River_Soar).

Sport
The stretch of the River Soar which passes through the centre of Leicester known as the 'Mile Straight' is home to De Montfort University Rowing Club, the University of Leicester Boat Club and Leicester Rowing Club a rowing and sculling club formed in 1882.

See also
List of crossings of the River Soar
Rivers of the United Kingdom
Soar Valley
Barrow-upon-Soar
Kingston-on- or upon-Soar
Normanton-on- or upon-Soar
Ratcliffe- or Radcliffe-upon-Soar
Stanford-on-Soar

References

External links

 River Soar at Canal and River Trust
 Leicester and Soar River Navigations at Canal Routes
 Leicester Environmental Strategy

River navigations in the United Kingdom
Rivers of Leicestershire
Rivers of Nottinghamshire
 
Tributaries of the River Trent